A dire wolf is an extinct canine.

Dire wolf or direwolf may also refer to:

 Direwolf (Game of Thrones), a fictional creature in George Martin's A Song of Ice and Fire series
 "Dire Wolf" (song), a song by the Grateful Dead from Workingman's Dead
 Worg (Dungeons & Dragons) or dire wolf, a type of dire animal in Dungeons & Dragons
 Dire Wolves, a group of characters from Cro